Godfrey Okoye University (GO University) was founded in 2009 by the Very Reverend Father Professor Dr. Christian Anieke for the Catholic Diocese of Enugu. The university, which got its operational licence on 3 November 2009 from the National Universities Commission (NUC), belongs to the Catholic Diocese of Enugu in Nigeria. It is the first university owned by a Catholic Diocese in Africa.

In 2009 the university started with 215 students and admitted 1,200 students by the end of 2012.

On 1 December 2013, GOU commenced a week-long programme of activities to celebrate its maiden convocation. 100 students were awarded bachelor's degrees during the final ceremony on 7 December 2013.

GOU is a member of the Committee of Vice-Chancellors of Nigerian Universities (CVC).

Faculties and courses

Faculties and courses postgraduate programmes

Partner universities and cooperations

All Hallows College, Dublin (Ireland)
BASF (Germany)
Bowie State University, Maryland (USA)
Birmingham City University (UK)
CIDJAP -  Catholic Institute for Development Justice and Peace, Enugu (Nigeria)
Cold Spring Harbor Laboratory, New York (USA)
, Geneva (Switzerland)
Gustav Siewerth Academy (Germany)
Hochschule für Angewandte Wissenschaften, Köln (Germany)
IECE - Institute of Ecumenical Education, Enugu (Nigeria)
Institut für Anglistik, Amerikanistik und Keltologie, Bonn (Germany)
Johannes Kepler Universität, Linz (Austria)
Leopold-Franzens-Universität, Innsbruck (Austria)
Leuphana University of Lüneburg (Germany)
Medical University of Innsbruck, Innsbruck (Austria)
Pontifical Lateran University, Rome (Italy)
Private Pädagogische Hochschule, Diözese Linz (Austria)
Rotary Club (Landshut, Germany)
Umuchinemere Procredit Microfinance Bank Nigeria Limited (Nigeria)
UNESCO (Paris)
Universität für Angewandte Wissenschaften, TH Köln (Germany)
University of Münster (Germany)
University of Nigeria, Nsukka (Nigeria)
University of Stellenbosch Business School (South Africa)

Radio station

On 27 October 2014 the radio station for the Mass Communication Department was formally commissioned by Prof. Armstrong Idachaba, director of the National Broadcasting Commission (NBC).

GO Uni Radio 106.9fm broadcasts live and via Internet from their studios at Godfrey Okoye University, Thinkers Corner, Enugu.

References

External links

Approved Academic Programmes of Nigerian Universities

Catholic universities and colleges in Nigeria
Enugu
Buildings and structures in Enugu State
2009 establishments in Nigeria
Educational institutions established in 2009